Temper is an English graffiti artist. He is most prolific in the advancement of spray paint photorealism in the United Kingdom. He was the first graffiti artist to create a conceptual collection on canvas and revolutionalised portraiture in popular culture globally with his "The Good Die Young" concept and collection in 2002. His groundbreaking 2001 exhibition "Minuteman" was the first by a solo graffiti artist in a public art gallery held at Birmingham Museum and Art Gallery in the United Kingdom and broke attendance records for ethnic minority audience. In 2001 he had his own signature can design on millions of Sprite cans throughout the UK and parts of Europe. During his twenty-two year professional career he has a record of 16 consecutive sellout collections.

The Lovely People at The Cube in Birmingham is a creation by the artist and one of the most popular public art sculptures within the city. Temper was given the West Midlands High Sheriff Award for his contributions to Art and Community in 2009 at the Botanical Gardens in Edgbaston Birmingham. His Post Graphaelite collection was exhibited at Whitehall Palace Banqueting Suite, London and is said to be one of the best examples of skilled freehand aerosol works on canvas in the world.

References

Year of birth missing (living people)
Living people
Pseudonymous artists
English graffiti artists